NGC 3369 is a lenticular galaxy located about 175 million light-years away in the constellation Hydra. NGC 3369 was discovered by astronomer Ormond Stone in 1886 and is an outlying member of the Hydra Cluster.

See also 
 List of NGC objects (3001–4000)

References

External links

Hydra Cluster
Hydra (constellation)
Lenticular galaxies
3369 
32191 
Astronomical objects discovered in 1886
Discoveries by Ormond Stone